Susan Andersen (born 1950) is an American writer of romance novels since 1989.

Biography
Born in 1950, Andersen was raised in Seattle, Washington with her two older brothers.  She trained as a dental assistant, although she did not like working for dentists.  After she turned 30, Andersen felt that she might have the "life experience to string an entire book together."
  Her first novel, Shadow Dance was published in 1989.

Her novels are known for being funny as well as containing "sexy sizzle and great characterization."  She has been nominated three times for Romantic Times Magazine'''s Reviewers' Choice Awards, winning in 1998 for Baby, I'm Yours.  She is a New York Times, USAToday, and Publishers Weekly best seller and has also been named a Romantic Times Career Achievement Award winner.  She has appeared ten times on the list of 10 novels picked as Amazon.com Editor's Choice (in 2001, 2002 and 2003, 2004, 2005, 2006, 2007, 2008, 2009,2010). Her novel Coming Undone was nominated for a RITA award.

Bibliography

Single novelsShadow Dance	1989/09Present Danger	1993/02Obsessed	        1993/10On Thin Ice	1995/08Exposure	1996/04
Baby, I'm Yours 1998/05
Be My Baby       1999/03
Baby, Don't Go   2000/05
All Shook Up     2001/05Burning Up           2010Running Wild        2015Notorious              2016It Had to Be You      2017

Marines SeriesHead Over Heels	2002/01Getting Lucky	2003/03Hot and Bothered	2004/08Coming Undone      2007/08

Las Vegas' showgirls SeriesSkintight	2005/07Just for Kicks	2006/08

The Sisterhood Diaries SeriesCutting Loose     2008/08Bending the Rules 2009Playing Dirty     2011Running Wild        2015

Razor Bay/Bradshaw Brothers SeriesThat Thing Called Love      2012Some Like It Hot                2013No Strings Attached''           2014

See also
List of romantic novelists

References and sources

External links
Susan Andersen's official web-site
Harlequin US official website

1950 births
20th-century American novelists
21st-century American novelists
American romantic fiction writers
American women novelists
Living people
Place of birth missing (living people)
20th-century American women writers
21st-century American women writers